The Elective Affinities is a 1996 Italian-French comedy film directed by Paolo and Vittorio Taviani. It was screened out of competition at the 1996 Cannes Film Festival.

Cast
 Isabelle Huppert (dubbed by Angiola Baggi) as Carlotta
 Fabrizio Bentivoglio as Ottone
 Jean-Hugues Anglade (dubbed by Roberto Pedicini) as Edoardo
 Marie Gillain (dubbed by Francesca Fiorentini) as Ottilia
 Massimo Popolizio as Marchese
 Laura Marinoni as Marchesa
 Consuelo Ciatti as Governante
 Stefania Fuggetta as Agostina
 Gavino Bondioli as Guardiacaccia
 Massimo Grigo as Cameriere
 Adelaide Foti as Albergatrice
 Giancarlo Carboni as Medico
 Giancarlo Giannini as Narrator (voice)

See also
 Isabelle Huppert on screen and stage

References

External links

1996 films
1996 comedy films
Italian comedy films
French comedy films
Films based on works by Johann Wolfgang von Goethe
Films directed by Paolo and Vittorio Taviani
Films set in Tuscany
Films set in the 1800s
1990s Italian-language films
1990s Italian films
1990s French films